"Fields of Gold" is a song written and performed by English musician Sting. It first appeared on his fourth studio album, Ten Summoner's Tales (1993). The song was released as a single on 7 June 1993, reaching  16 on the UK Singles Chart and No. 23 on the US Billboard Hot 100. The song also reached No. 2 in Canada and No. 6 in Iceland. In 1994, it was awarded one of BMI's Pop Songs Awards.

Background
"Fields of Gold" and all the other tracks on the album were recorded at Lake House, Wiltshire, mixed at The Townhouse Studio, London, England and mastered at Masterdisk, New York City. The harmonica solo is played by Brendan Power, and the Northumbrian smallpipes are played by Kathryn Tickell. The music video was directed by Kevin Godley. The cover of the single was photographed at Wardour Old Castle in Wiltshire, as was the cover for the album Ten Summoner's Tales.

In Lyrics By Sting, the singer described the view from his 16th-century Wiltshire manor house:

Critical reception
In a retrospective review, Stephen Thomas Erlewine from AllMusic called "Fields of Gold" a "peaceful ballad", noting that it ranks as a classic. Larry Flick from Billboard described it as a "deeply alluring ballad with atmosphere to burn." He added, "Impeccably produced, it features a strong seductive vocal (and nice harmonica strains) from Sting, as well as lovely harplike acoustic guitar figures from band mate Dominic Miller. Among the most distinctive and beguiling songs the man has written, it's sure to earn a powerful multiformat reception, and thereby steal a few million hearts." Irish Bray People viewed it as "moody but ultimately likeable". The Daily Vault's David Bowling felt that it is one of the "brilliant pop songs of the 1990s." He stated that it remains "the perfect ballad. It is a wistful love song looking back on love gained." In his weekly UK chart commentary, James Masterton wrote, "For a man who is normally considered an albums artist this is an achievement indeed, a third hit in a row from his latest album, and all of them Top 20 hits." Alan Jones from Music Week gave "Fields of Gold" four out of five and named it Pick of the Week, calling it a "lilting, haunting, soothing, almost folky song". He added that "the uncluttered arrangement and intimate vocals are excellent". In an 2015 review, Pop Rescue commented, "This song is so wonderfully mellow, and flows so perfectly, that it’s near impossible to find fault with it."
In an interview at the Liverpool Institute for Performing Arts, Paul McCartney stated that "Fields of Gold" was a song he wished he'd written himself.

Music video
The accompanying music video for "Fields of Gold", directed by Kevin Godley, features a gold silhouette of Sting singing the song while walking through a dark village at night containing common features seen throughout the UK such as a red telephone box and a red pillar box. Scenes also feature Sting singing the song while bathed in blue and gold light. The silhouette of Sting is shown as such that the background inside him exactly matches the background of the surrounding village, only the version inside of him is bright and bustling with people, while the version outside is dark and dead. The video ends with the camera going into the silhouette and Sting's clothing disappearing, showing a final shot of the village at daylight and with various people. It was published on YouTube in September 2011. The video has amassed more than 80 million views as of October 2022.

Release
"Fields of Gold" was the second single released from the album after "If I Ever Lose My Faith in You". The single reached No. 16 on the UK Singles Chart, No. 23 on the Billboard Hot 100 and No. 2 on the Canadian RPM Top Singles chart. It was also a hit in Germany, Iceland, Ireland, the Netherlands, Switzerland and many other countries. "Fields of Gold" was awarded one of BMI's Pop Songs Awards in 1994, honoring the songwriters, composers and music publishers of the song.

The song was included in Sting's first compilations album issued under the title Fields of Gold: The Best of Sting 1984–1994 and released in 1994 and in a later compilation The Very Best of Sting & The Police in 1997. It was re-recorded by Sting in 2006 as a bonus track for his classical album Songs from the Labyrinth, in which the song was accompanied entirely by a lute.

Cover versions
Many musical artists have covered the song. American singer and guitarist Eva Cassidy recorded a version that first appeared on her 1996 live album Live at Blues Alley, then later on her albums Songbird (1998) and The Best of Eva Cassidy (2012). Cassidy's version charted in Sweden and the Netherlands in 2008 and 2013, respectively. British-Georgian singer Katie Melua, a fan of Cassidy, recorded a version that was released as the BBC Children in Need single for 2017; her version peaked at No. 29 on the UK Singles Chart. In 2022, Drew and Ellie Holcomb recorded a version for their album Coming Home: A Collection of Songs. Megan McKenna released a cover in November 2022.

Track listings
 UK 4-track CD single
 "Fields of Gold"
 "King of Pain" (live)
 "Fragile" (live)
 "Purple Haze" (live)

 UK limited edition 4-track gatefold CD single
 "Fields of Gold"
 "Message in a Bottle" (live)
 "Fortress Around Your Heart" (live)
 "Roxanne" (live)

Charts

Weekly charts
Sting version

Eva Cassidy version

Katie Melua version

Year-end charts
Sting version

Certifications

References

External links
 Second Hand Songs: "Fields of gold" song page

1993 songs
1993 singles
2001 singles
2017 singles
A&M Records singles
Children in Need singles
Cliff Richard songs
Eva Cassidy songs
Katie Melua songs
Michael Bolton songs
Rock ballads
Sting (musician) songs
Song recordings produced by Hugh Padgham
Songs written by Sting (musician)
1990s ballads